Cornel Dobre (born 5 July 1975) is a Romanian former footballer who played as a right-back.

Honours
Juventus București
Liga III: 2009–10

External links
 

1975 births
Living people
Romanian footballers
Association football defenders
Liga I players
Liga II players
AFC Rocar București players
FC Dinamo București players
FC U Craiova 1948 players
FC Astra Giurgiu players
ASC Oțelul Galați players
FC Argeș Pitești players
FC Unirea Urziceni players
CSM Ceahlăul Piatra Neamț players
CS Mioveni players
FC Progresul București players
ASC Daco-Getica București players